Prince Teodor Lubomirski (1683–1745) was a Polish nobleman (szlachcic).

He was the oldest son of Stanisław Herakliusz Lubomirski and his first wife Elżbieta Denhoff.
He was owner of Lańcut, Ujazdów and Połonne. Voivode of Kraków Voivodeship and starost of Spisz.

As Sejm Marshal he led the extraordinary Sejms on 22–27 August 1729 and 2–14 October 1730 in Grodno.

He died on 6 February 1745 in Ujazdów and was buried in Czerniaków.

He married Elżbieta Culler-Cuming and had two children, Kasper Lubomirski and Anna (d. 1771).

Footnotes 

Secular senators of the Polish–Lithuanian Commonwealth
Field marshals of Austria
1683 births
1745 deaths
Teodor
Knights of the Golden Fleece of Austria